Mebarek is a given name and surname of North African descent.

List of people with the given name 

 Mebarek Soltani (born 1982), Algerian boxer

List of people with the surname 

 Mahrez Mebarek (born 1985), Algerian swimmer
 Nora Mebarek (born 1972), French politician

See also 

 Muborak, Uzbekistan

Given names
Surnames
Masculine given names
Arabic-language surnames
Surnames of Algerian origin